Jurm may refer to:
 Jurm District, Badakhshan Province, Afghanistan
 Jorm, Afghanistan, also spelled Jorm, the capital of the district
 Jurm (1990 film), 1990 Bollywood film starring Vinod Khanna
 Jurm (2005 film), 2005 Bollywood film starring Bobby Deol and Lara Dutta